General Dezydery Chłapowski Landscape Park (Park Krajobrazowy im. gen. It is named after the 19th-century Polish general and activist Dezydery Chłapowski.

The Park lies within Greater Poland Voivodeship: in Kościan County (Gmina Czempiń, Gmina Kościan, Gmina Krzywiń) and Śrem County (Gmina Śrem).

References 

Landscape parks in Poland
Parks in Greater Poland Voivodeship